The 2004–05 season is Hyderabad cricket team's 71st competitive season. The Hyderabad cricket team is senior men's domestic cricket team based in the city of Hyderabad, India, run by the Hyderabad Cricket Association. They represent the region of Telangana in the state of Andhra Pradesh in domestic competitions.

Competition Overview

Squads

 Irani Cup
Rayudu got selected to the Rest of India squad for the 2004 Irani Cup, a first-class cricket competition in India.

Deodhar Trophy
Laxman, Arjun and Vishnuvardhan got selected to the South Zone squad for the 2004-05 Deodhar Trophy, a List-A cricket competition in India.

NKP Salve Challenger Trophy
Laxman and Rayudu got picked to the India B squad for the 2004-05 NKP Salve Challenger Trophy, a List-A cricket tournament in India.

Duleep Trophy
Laxman got selected to the South Zone squad for the 2004-05 Duleep Trophy, a first-class cricket tournament in India.

Ranji Trophy

The Hyderabad team, led by Venkatapathy Raju, began their campaign in the Ranji Trophy, the premier first-class cricket tournament in India, with a loss against Tamil Nadu at Chennai on 7 November 2004. The Hyderabad captain, Raju announced his retirement from the first-class cricket during the third day of the match against the Uttar Pradesh. V. V. S. Laxman replaced Raju as the captain of the Hyderabad for the remaining two matches. They finished inside top-2 in Group B of the Elite League to advance to the Elite semi-final with four wins and two losses. They were eliminated in the semi-final where the Railways defeated the Hyderabad by 7 wickets.

Points Table
Elite Group B

  Top two teams advanced to the knockout stage.
  Bottom team relegated to the Plate Group for the 2005–06 Ranji Trophy.
 Points system : Win by an innings or 10 wickets = 5, Win = 4, Draw with first innings lead = 2, No Result = 2, Draw with first innings deficit = 0, Loss = 0.

Knockout stage

Matches
Group Stage

Semi-final

Statistics
Most runs

 Source: Cricinfo
Most wickets

 Source: Cricinfo

Ranji One–Day Trophy
The Hyderabad team, led by Arjun Yadav, began their campaign in the Subbaiah Pillai Trophy as part of the South Zone Ranji One–Day Trophy, a List-A cricket tournament in India, with a loss against the Karnataka at Margao on 9 January 2005. The Hyderabad troubled the Karnataka top-order with three quick wickets but the middle-order helped the Karnataka to recover to 244 while the tight-bowling by the Karnataka bowlers ensured them a 15-run win despite the half-centuries from Daniel Manohar, Arjun and Ambati Rayudu. In a 42-over reduced rain-hit match, the top-order and lower-order collapse despite the half-centuries from Rayudu and Anirudh Singh restricted the Hyderabad to 166 while an unbeaten half-century from Sreekumar Nair helped the Kerala chase the target with five-wickets to spare. In the third match, the century from Abhinav Kumar along with an unbeaten half-century from Anirudh helped the Hyderabad post 288 but an unbeaten half-century from Sridharan Sharath and the half-century from Subramaniam Badrinath helped the Tamil Nadu chase the target with six-wickets to spare. In the fourth match, the Hyderabad top-order failed once again but the half-century from Rayudu and collective effort from the others helped them recover to 254 while the three-wicket haul from Inder Shekar Reddy along with the two-wicket hauls from Sankinani Vishnuvardhan and Pagadala Niranjan helped the Hyderabad win their first match of the tournament against the Goa by 78 runs despite the half-century from Mandar Phadke. In the final zonal match, Yalaka Venugopal Rao's five wicket haul helped the Andhra bowl the Hyderabad out for 144 while an unbeaten half-century from M. S. K. Prasad helped the Andhra chase the target with four-wickets to spare despite two-wicket hauls and tight bowling from Inder Shekar and Shivaji. This loss resulted the Hyderabad finish at fourth in the South Zone and failed to advance to the knockout stage with a win and four losses.

Points Table
South Zone

Matches
Zonal Stage

Statistics
Most runs

 Source: Cricinfo
Most wickets

 Source: Cricinfo

See also
 Hyderabad cricket team
 Hyderabad Cricket Association

References

External links
Hyderabad cricket team official site

Cricket in Hyderabad, India
Cricket in Telangana
Sport in Telangana